Guangzhou Nansha Economic and Technological Development Zone is a national economic development zone in China, which was established in 1993. It is located at Nansha District, the southeast of Guangzhou, and on the west bank of Humen Watercourse in the estuary of the Pearl River. It has a developed area of 17.67 square kilometres.

Plastic, chemical, electronic, food processing and shipbuilding are the main industries in the zone.

References

External links
Guangzhou Nansha Economic and Technological Development Zone 
Guangzhou Nansha Economic and Technological Development Zone  

1993 establishments in China
Panyu District
Nansha District
Special Economic Zones of China